The New Lynn to Avondale shared path, also known as the NL2A path, is a shared path in the west of Auckland linking New Lynn and Avondale railway stations. It links with the Waterview shared path, and will link with local cycling networks in New Lynn, as well as the under construction Te Whau shared pathway. Though grade-separated or off-road for most of its length, it does have several road crossings, which have drawn criticism.

History
Construction of the pathway was first suggested in 2015, as a 'spur line' from the Waterview shared path, which was being designed at the time. The idea stemmed from old Auckland Council plans for a cycleway along the Western Line. Consultation on the pathway then opened to the public for a few months in 2016, followed by public consultation on improvements to local cycling networks in New Lynn and Avondale. Notable in the plans was the inclusion of a new bridge over the Whau River.

In October 2017, Auckland Transport released an updated design based on feedback during the consultation period. The largest change was the addition of an underpass at the St George's Rd rail crossing, at the behest of KiwiRail, who wished to avoid new level crossings with the frequency of Auckland's passenger rail increasing in the coming years. AT announced works would begin in the first quarter of 2018, with an aim to finish the project by 2020. After some delays, the construction contract was awarded and work begun in early November 2019, with a new completion date of early 2022.

The complete path was opened to the public on 4 June 2022, after a blessing by mana whenua and an official opening ceremony, attended by Mayor of Auckland Phil Goff and Minister for Transport Michael Wood. The pathway overall cost $44.3 million to construct.

Criticism
The pathway has attracted criticism from public transport advocates, both before and after its opening, who say that the pathway, while a good link in the network and an effective low-carbon way of travel, lacks proper wayfinding signage and feels like it was designed by engineers rather than for people. They are also critical of a pinch point in the path near Avondale railway station, where cyclists are instructed to dismount and walk their bike, for their own safety and the safety of others. Most of all, they criticise the dangerous nature of some of the pathway's level crossings, which are not signalised and lack a raised table.

References

External links
Auckland Transport - New Lynn to Avondale shared path

Cycleways in Auckland
Whau Local Board Area
West Auckland, New Zealand